Gerard Soeteman (born 1 July 1936 in Rotterdam) is a Dutch screenwriter. He worked together with Paul Verhoeven on several films, such as Turkish Delight and Black Book. He also wrote the screenplay for The Assault, which won the Academy Award for Best Foreign Language Film in 1986.

Film credits
Business Is Business (1971)
Turkish Delight (1973)
Katie Tippel (1975)
Max Havelaar (1976)
Soldier of Orange (1977)
 (1979)
Spetters (1980)
All Things Pass (1981)
The Fourth Man (1983)
Flesh & Blood (1985)
The Assault (1986)
The Bunker (1992) Also director.
Claim (2002)
Floris (2004)
Black Book (2006)

External links

1936 births
Living people
Dutch screenwriters
Dutch male screenwriters
Mass media people from Rotterdam